The  was an archaeological site on the border of  Shinagawa, Tokyo and Ōta, Tokyo, in the Kantō region of Japan containing a late Jōmon period  shell midden and settlement ruin. The site was designated a National Historic Site of Japan in 1955, with the area under protection extended in 1986.

Overview
During the early to middle Jōmon period (approximately 4000 to 2500 BC), sea levels were five to six meters higher than at present, and the ambient temperature was also 2 deg C higher. During this period, the Kantō region was inhabited by the Jōmon people, many of whom lived in coastal settlements. The middens associated with such settlements contain bone, botanical material, mollusc shells, sherds, lithics, and other artifacts and ecofacts associated with the now-vanished inhabitants, and these features, provide a useful source into the diets and habits of Jōmon society. Most of these middens are found along the Pacific coast of Japan. 

An American scientist, Edward Sylvester Morse who was researching shellfish, planned a research project for Brachiopoda in Japan. He arrived in Yokohama on June 18, 1877 and while taking the Keihin Tohoku Line train to Tokyo on June 20, noticed what appeared to be a shell midden from the window of his train shortly past Ōmori Station. Using his position and influence at the newly established Tokyo Imperial University, he conducted an archaeological excavation of the shell midden several times from September to November 1877. The artifacts found were mainly Jōmon pottery, stone tools, bone tools, and animal and human bones, which were displayed at the university's museum in 1879. The pottery was from then late to the beginning of the final Jōmon period per modern classification systems. Morse published a report on his findings  both in English and Japanese in 1879, with an especially detailed analysis of the shells found, noting evidence on changes in the environment based on the contents of the layers in the mound, and comparing with similar shell middens in other countries. He also emphasized the importance of protection of the cultural properties. However, the most important aspect of Morse's work was his introduction of modern techniques in laying the foundations scientific archaeology and anthropology in Japan. It was one of the earliest excavations of the shell mounds in the world, and it was fortuitous that Morse had previous experience in the excavations of the shell mounds in Florida before his arrival in Japan.  

However, Morse kept no records of the details of the excavation itself, and over the years, the exact location of the site became uncertain. In 1929, a location in the Ōi neighborhood of Shinagawa was identified and marked with a stone monument as  "The Shell Mounds of Omori". However, in 1930 a rival site located near Ōmori Station was identified and was also marked with a monument. The sites are separated by about 300 meters. As the original size of the shell midden was very large, it is possible that these two locations are part of the same midden. It is also possible that the Ōmori site was the one seen by Morse from his train window, whereas the Shinagawa site was where he actually excavated. In any case, both rival sites were collectively designated as a National Historic Site in 1955. The artifacts excavated were designated as National Important Cultural Properties in 1975.

See also

List of Historic Sites of Japan (Tōkyō)

References

External links

Ota City home page 
Shinagawa Historical Museum home page 

Archaeological sites in Japan
Jōmon period
Shinagawa
Ōta, Tokyo
Shell middens in Japan
History of Tokyo
Historic Sites of Japan